Erply is an enterprise software company which provides cloud-based point of sale and inventory management technology. It was founded in Estonia by Kristjan Hiiemaa in 2009. As of 2010, the company has 2,000 users and 700 paid subscribers.

History
In 2009, the company won Seedcamp, a European early stage investment program.

In March 2010, they received $2 million in funding from Saul Klein (Index Ventures), Satish Dharmaraj (Redpoint Ventures), Dave McClure and Kenny van Zant.

Description
The service was initially a retail payment solution for small to medium-sized businesses. They have since expanded to larger box retailers, and provide systems for point of sales, inventory control, billing, and other retail-related technologies. The service retails for $74 per month on average.

In August 2011, the company released a mobile credit card reader for handheld mobile devices such as Apple iPads.

Reception
Erply has been profiled in media publications such as The Wall Street Journal, the Financial Times and the BBC.Erply as one of the top ten European startups to watch in 2011.

References

External links
Erply.com

Companies based in San Francisco
Internet in Estonia
Enterprise application integration
Point of sale companies
Business software
Retail point of sale systems